Kaivo (The Well) is a 1992 Finnish drama film directed by Pekka Lehto and starring by Merja Larivaara. It was entered into the competition at the 49th Venice International Film Festival. As of 2010, Kaivo is the all-time twelfth most expensive Finnish film.

Plot
Based on a true story, the film is about a young farm hostess (Merja Larivaara) whose depression and mental illness end up to drown her three children in a pit.

References

External links

1992 films
1992 drama films
Finnish drama films
1990s Finnish-language films
Films directed by Pekka Lehto
Fiction about familicide